Walter de Burgsted was an English judge and Lord Warden of the Cinque Ports during the thirteenth century.

In 1262 Walter de Burgsted was given a commission 'to keep the Cinque Ports', effectively authorising him control of the South Coast, and charging him with maintaining its defences.

At this time the office of Lord Warden had not been officially established, and such men were known as Keepers of the Coast. He also received the command of Constable of Dover Castle, but the appointments were not made at the same time, having not been merged into one office until after the conclusion of the Second Barons' War.

References

Lords Warden of the Cinque Ports
13th-century English judges
13th-century English Navy personnel